The 2004–05 First League of Serbia and Montenegro (officially known as the Meridian PrvaLiga for sponsorship reasons) was the third season of the Serbia and Montenegro's top-level football league since its establishment. It was contested by 16 teams, and FK Partizan won the championship.

Teams 
Budućnost Banatski Dvor, Napredak Kruševac and Radnički Obrenovac were relegated to the 2004–05 Serbian First League while Kom was relegated to the 2004–05 Montenegrin First League after the last season for finishing last.

The relegated teams were replaced by 2003–04 Second League of Serbia and Montenegro east, west, south and north champions Radnički Beograd, Hajduk Beograd, Budućnost Podgorica and Čukarički Stankom.

League table

Results

Winning squad

 Head coach:  Vladimir Vermezović

Note: * Played only in the first part of the championship.

Top goalscorers

References

External links 
 Tables and results at RSSSF

First League of Serbia and Montenegro
1
1
Serbia